Pristimantis imitatrix is a species of frog in the family Strabomantidae.
It is found in Peru and possibly Bolivia.
Its natural habitats are tropical moist lowland forests and rivers.

References

imitatrix
Amphibians of Peru
Endemic fauna of Peru
Amphibians described in 1978
Taxonomy articles created by Polbot